The Frazer Nash Le Mans Coupe, is a sports race car, designed, developed, and built by British manufacturer Frazer Nash, between 1953 and 1956.

References

Sports cars
Cars of England
1950s cars